Jan Willem Pennink (born 31 March 1929) is a Dutch rower. He competed in the men's coxed four event at the 1952 Summer Olympics.

References

1929 births
Living people
Dutch male rowers
Olympic rowers of the Netherlands
Rowers at the 1952 Summer Olympics
Sportspeople from Jakarta